Bartov is a surname. Notable people with the surname include:

David Bartov (1924–2018), Israeli judge
Hanoch Bartov (1926–2016), Israeli author and journalist
Omer Bartov (born 1954), Israeli academic, son of Hanoch

See also
Bartow (name)